The Piano Concerto No. 17 in G major, KV. 453, by Wolfgang Amadeus Mozart, was written in 1784.

The work is orchestrated for solo piano, flute, two oboes, two bassoons, two horns, and strings. As is typical with concerti, it is in three movements:

Allegro, 
Andante,  in C major
Allegretto – Presto, 

According to the date that the composer himself noted on the score, the concerto was completed on April 12, 1784.

The date of the premiere is uncertain. In one view, the work is said to have been premiered by Mozart's student Barbara Ployer on June 13, 1784, at a concert to which Mozart had invited Giovanni Paisiello to hear both her and his new compositions, including also his recently written Quintet in E flat for Piano and Winds. Afterwards, Ployer was joined by Mozart in a performance of the Sonata for Two Pianos, K. 448. Another possibility, advanced by Lorenz (2006, 314), is that Mozart did not wait over two months to premiere the work, but performed it in his concert with Regina Strinasacchi on 29 April 1784 at the Kärntnertortheater. As a general consensus for researchers, it can be said with relative certainty that the work premiered during the mid-to-late spring of 1784, following its completion.

The finale is a variation movement whose theme was sung by Mozart's starling.

References
Hutchings, A. A Companion to Mozart's Piano Concertos, Oxford University Press.
Lorenz, Michael (2006) "New And Old Documents Concerning Mozart's Pupils Barbara Ployer And Josepha Auernhammer", Eighteenth-Century Music 3/2, (Cambridge University Press).

External links
 
 

17
Compositions in G major
1784 compositions